Central High School is a high school located in Aberdeen, South Dakota with an enrollment of approximately 1,300 students. Since 2004, the school has been located at a new site located at 2200 South Roosevelt Street. The new location is on the outskirts of the southeast side of town.

The Thomas F. Kelley Theatre is the fine arts and multi-purpose venue. Golden Eagles Arena is the high school gymnasium that has hosted a number of South Dakota High School Activities Association state championship events. Clark Swisher Field is the outdoor athletic complex located on the Central High School Campus. This complex is an ongoing joint project between Northern State University, the Aberdeen Public Schools, and the City of Aberdeen. The complex hosts both university and high school events in football, soccer, and track.

Central High School is committed to meeting all requirements under the No Child Left Behind Act and was honored with the Siemens Award for Advanced Placement achievement in math and science in 2008. This award is given to the top performing high school in the state of South Dakota.

Central High School ACT scores beat both national and state averages. The staff consists of over 100 people. Central students may earn college credit through the Rising Scholars Program or one of the many Advanced Placement opportunities available. Central High School partners with the Hub Area Vocational School to offer a large number of vocational learning experiences.

Athletics 
Central's mascot is the Golden Eagle. The school has a rich history of athletic success with athletic teams for boys' football, basketball, wrestling, track, cross-country, tennis, golf, and newly added soccer. Teams for girls include volleyball, basketball, track, cross country, gymnastics, tennis, golf, competitive cheer and dance, and soccer. Their football and soccer teams compete on Swisher Field which sits next to the high school. 

'State Championships:
 Boys Basketball - 1913, 1933, 1938, 1949, 1953, 1961, 1977, 1988
 Boys Track - 2002
 Girls Volleyball - 2002, 2009, 2015
 Girls Basketball - 2016, 2018
 Wrestling - 2014

Central High School participate* Boys Basketball - 1977, 1988
s in the Eastern South Dakota Athletic Conference, the oldest conference in South Dakota. Students can also participate in numerous clubs and activities on campus, including drama, band, chorus, speech and debate.

 Speech and debate 
Aberdeen Central has won 9 team state championships in Speech and Debate (2004, 2006, 2007, 2009, 2012, 2013, 2014, 2015, 2017, 2018, 2019, 2020, 2021), and 2022, the most of any school in South Dakota. The 6 consecutive team state championships won from 2017-2022 marks the longest consecutive win streak in class AA SDHSAA history.

Aberdeen Central was awarded the National Speech and Debate Association's Debate School of Excellence Award in 2014 and 2015, recognizing it as one of the top 20 debate schools in the nation. Aberdeen Central is 1 of only 3 schools (along with Bellaire High School of Texas & Durham Academy of North Carolina) to have ever won the award in back to back years.

Students from Aberdeen Central compete in all events sanctioned by the South Dakota High School Activities Association and National Speech and Debate Association including: Policy Debate, Lincoln Douglas Debate, Public Forum Debate, Original Oratory, Extemporaneous Speaking, Oral Interpretation, and Student Congress.

Aberdeen Central has won the state championship in Policy Debate four times (1965, 1997, 2008, 2010).

Aberdeen Central has won the state championship in Lincoln Douglas twice (2012 & 2013).

Aberdeen Central has won the state championship in Public Forum four times (2006, 2013, 2014, 2016).

Aberdeen Central has won the state championship in Original Oratory eight times (1954, 1961, 1991, 2002, 2007, 2008, 2009, 2010).

Aberdeen Central has won the state championship in International Extemporaneous Speaking five times (2001, 2004, 2007, 2008, 2012).

Aberdeen Central has won the state championship in U.S. Extemporaneous Speaking three times (1988, 2007, 2008).

 School leadership 
 Jason Uttermark, Principal Tina Board, Asst. Principal Jake Phillips, Asst. Principal''

Notable alumni
Tom Daschle, (Class of 1965); former U.S. Senator and Senate Majority Leader
Josh Heupel, quarterback for the 2000 National Champion Oklahoma Sooners football team, and head coach at Tennessee Volunteers
Taylor Mehlhaff, NFL kicker
Dean M. Peterson, developer of Instamatic and point-and-shoot cameras
Eddie Spears, film actor and model
Michael Spears, film actor and model

References

External links

SDHSAA school info

Buildings and structures in Aberdeen, South Dakota
Public high schools in South Dakota
Schools in Brown County, South Dakota
Sports teams in Aberdeen, South Dakota